Pauline Guichard (born 14 November 1988, in Colombes) is a French chess player and an International Master. She won the Women's section of the 2018 and 2019 French Chess Championship.

She participated in the 2010 Chess Olympiad in Khanty-Mansiysk, the 2014 Chess Olympiad, and the 2018 Chess Olympiad.

References

External links 
 
 
Pauline Guichard chess games at 365Chess.com

Chess woman grandmasters
1988 births
Living people
Sportspeople from Colombes
Chess Olympiad competitors
French female chess players